AppZapper is an application for Apple's macOS developed by Austin Sarner and Brian Ball.

The software is an uninstall utility which extends the method of uninstalling in macOS, which is dragging the application one wants to uninstall to the trash. By dragging and dropping an application to uninstall in AppZapper, the application searches for additional files residing in directories other than that of the original application, such as preference files and package receipts, the user is then able to select unwanted files and delete them.

Apart from the core functionality of AppZapper, other features of the application include a safety system which protects system files and user designated applications from being deleted and a log of uninstalled applications.

AppZapper 2 was released in 2010.

References

External links
Official site
Interview: AppZapper developer Austin Sarner, Glenn Wolsey,

Reviews
AppZapper Review at MacNN

Uninstallers for macOS